At Cafe 6 is a 2016 Chinese-Taiwanese romance film directed by Neal Wu and starring Dong Zijian, Cherry Ngan, Austin Lin, Ouyang Nini and Song Yiren. It was released in Taiwan on July 15, 2016 and in China on July 29, 2016.

Plot
On a rainy night, Miss Liang argued with her long-distance boyfriend. She went back home after an extra shift, had her car broken down, and followed a bearded passerby to a place address that was not in the sixth lane, but was named “Street Six Cafe” to look for shelter from rain. The owner served a cup of unsweetened cappuccino and hummed a story that took place in the summer of 1996. (Due to the turmoil of the “political stance” of Dai Liren, who plays the role of a cafe owner, this part of the clip was deleted when it was released in mainland China.)

That year they were in high school. Guan Minlü or Xiao Lu (Dong Zijian) played with his friend Xiao Bozhi (Austin Lin). Xiao Lu has a crush on his classmate Li Xinrui or Xiao Rui (Cherry Ngan), but she always had Cai Xinyi (Ouyang Nini) right beside her, and her classmates Song Yiren (Song Yiren) who had crush on Xiao Lu. They were in the same class, yet the distance between Xiao Lu and Xiao Rui is far apart. Even if love can blossom, can the long distance after high school graduation, hold the hearts as if they were now, not separating from each other and be with each other?

Cast
Dong Zijian as Guan Minlü
Cherry Ngan as Li Xinrui 
Austin Lin as Xiao Bozhi
Ouyang Nini as Cai Xinyi
Song Yiren as Song Yiren 
Frankie Huang as Gangster

Awards and nominations

References

Chinese romance films
Taiwanese romance films
2016 romance films
Chinese coming-of-age films
Coming-of-age romance films